The Chicago American was an afternoon newspaper published in Chicago, under various names until its dissolution in 1974.

History
The paper's first edition came out on July 4, 1900, as Hearst's Chicago American. It became the Morning American in 1902 with the appearance of an afternoon edition. The morning and Sunday papers were renamed as the Examiner in 1904. James Keeley bought the Chicago Record-Herald and Chicago Inter-Ocean in 1914, merging them into a single newspaper known as the Herald. William Randolph Hearst purchased the paper from Keeley in 1918.

 [[File:1919 Newspaper Circulation Chicago EP July 24 1919 p 31.png|thumb|Circulation figures for Chicago newspapers appearing in Editor & Publisher in 1919.  The American'''s circulation of 330,216 placed it third in the city, behind the Chicago Tribune (424,026) and Chicago Daily News (386,498), and ahead of the Chicago Herald-Examiner (289,094).]]  Distribution of the Herald Examiner after 1918 was controlled by gangsters. Dion O'Banion, Vincent Drucci, Hymie Weiss and Bugs Moran first sold the Tribune. They were then recruited by Moses Annenberg, who offered more money to sell the Examiner, later the Herald-Examiner. This "selling" consisted of pressuring stores and news dealers. In 1939, Annenberg was sentenced to three years in prison for fraud and died behind bars.

The newspaper joined the Associated Press on October 31, 1932.

Under pressure from his lenders, Hearst consolidated the American and the Herald-Examiner in 1939. It continued as the Chicago Herald-American until 1953 when it became the Chicago American. The American was bought by the Chicago Tribune in 1956, and was renamed as Chicago's American in 1959.

As with many other afternoon dailies, the paper suffered in postwar years from declining circulation figures caused in part by television news and in part by population shifts from city to suburbs. The paper continued as an afternoon broadsheet until 1969 when the Tribune converted the paper to the tabloid-format Chicago Today. Measures to bolster the paper were unsuccessful, and Chicago Today published its final issue on September 13, 1974. The Chicago Tribune inherited many of the Today's writers and staff and became a 24-hour operation.

The American was the product of the merger or acquisition of 14 predecessor newspapers and inherited the tradition and the files of all of them.

As an afternoon paper, the American was dependent on street sales rather than subscriptions, and it was breaking news that brought street sales. The American was noted for its aggressive reporting. Its editors, writers, and photographers went hard after every story. It was not uncommon for them to pretend to be police officers or public officials to get a story, although many of them could simply talk their way into any place.

These techniques were usually used legitimately. Reporters demanded information as if they had a right to it, and would often get it. With its connections to news sources and its bravado, the small staff of the American regularly scooped its larger, more respectable afternoon competition, the Chicago Daily News.

When Frank Lloyd Wright announced plans to build a mile-high building in Chicago, the American stole the drawings and printed them.

The tradition was exemplified by the longtime night city editor of the American, Harry Romanoff, "Romy," who could create news stories almost at will with only a telephone. He ran the city room at night with the help of two rewrite men (including Mike McGovern, noted below), one night photo editor, a sports desk editor (Brent Musburger's first job out of journalism school) and one night copy boy who "cut and pasted AP and UPI wires for Harry's review). Since the afternoon paper was put together the previous evening, the night city editor was the key news editor. Moreover, "Romy" a stout, cigar-chomping, suspendered, order-barking commander of the city desk, enjoyed the fearful but absolute regard of pressmen, the composing room and the entire night staff of the Tribune Tower, which owned and housed the Chicago Americans operations in its final decades.

One night floods threatened Southern Illinois, and the American did not have a big story for the front page. Romanoff called fire departments and police stations throughout the region, posing as "Captain Parmenter of the state police" (a nonexistent individual), urging them to take action. One fire department, bemused by the call, asked what they should do. "Ring those fire bells! Call out the people!" Romanoff then turned to his rewrite man to dictate the lead story:

Fire bells rang over southern Illinois as police and fire departments called out the people to warn them of impending floods.

It never did flood, but the American had its banner headline. These headlines were necessary for sales of the early editions. Later in the day, breaking news would generally replace them or reduce their importance. Of course, many stories developed in this way were genuine scoops that would be expanded in later editions.

The American gave the same attention to smaller stories as to large ones. It was usually first with police news. One notable headline:
Mother of 14 kids kills father of 9 in police station

Headquarters for the paper was the Hearst Building, located at 326 West Madison Street in Chicago. In 1961, the offices of Chicago's American were moved adjacent to the Tribune Tower at 435 North Michigan Avenue, where they would remain until the ultimate demise of Chicago Today in 1974.

Notable people

In addition to Romanoff, notable American staff members included:
 Frank R. Adams, reporter for Herald-Examiner, author, songwriter and screenwriter
 Ann Barzel, dance critic, 1951-1974
 Seymour Berkson, reporter for Herald-Examiner, later general manager of the International News Service and publisher for the New York Journal-American
 Claude Binyon, reporter for the Examiner, became a Hollywood screenwriter and director
 Arthur Brisbane, named editor of the Herald-Examiner in 1918; later became a renowned New York newspaper editor and syndicated columnist
 Warren Brown, sportswriter, covered 50 consecutive World Series; winner of Spink Award from baseball's Hall of Fame;
 John P. Carmichael, sportswriter 1927-32, then Chicago Daily News columnist and sports editor until 1972
 S. S. Chamberlain, Chicago Examiner editor; later editor of Cosmopolitan magazine
 Bartlett Cormack, reporter for the American, then a Hollywood screenwriter whose films included The Racket and Fury, as well as the original adaptation of The Front Page
 Homer Davenport, cartoonist, came to Chicago Herald in 1893 during World's Columbian Exposition
 Billy DeBeck, cartoonist, creator of comic strip Barney Google
 John Denson, editor; executive editor of New York Journal-American; managing editor of Newsweek
 Eddie Doherty, reporter for the Examiner and American, then Oscar-nominated screenwriter of The Fighting Sullivans
 Charles Dryden, considered the best baseball writer of his era; first hired in 1898 by the New York Journal; capped his career with the Tribune and Herald-Examiner; coined the name "Hitless Wonders" for the 1906 White Sox
 Carl Ed, cartoonist, creator of comic strip Harold Teen
 James Enright, sportswriter and basketball referee, inducted into the Naismith Memorial Basketball Hall of Fame
 Dave Feldman, the Americans horse-racing writer and handicapper from 1939-1968, then the same for the Daily News and Sun-Times
 Leo Fischer, sports editor of the American from 1943-1969, and also after the paper became Chicago Today; for four years, simultaneously was president of the National Basketball League, precursor to today's NBA
 Tom Fitzpatrick, worked as a reporter for the American before joining the Sun-Times and winning a 1970 Pulitzer Prize 
 Hugh Fullerton, while covering the 1919 World Series for the Herald-Examiner, became suspicious of the Chicago White Sox's play; his articles culminated in eight Sox players being accused of conspiring with gamblers and subsequently being banned from baseball for life 
 Chester Gould, cartoonist; creator of Dick Tracy; drew a number of comic strips for the Evening American before being hired away by the Chicago Tribune in 1931
 Robert Gruenberg, Washington bureau chief for the American, 1963-65
 Richard Hainey, the Americans executive editor. Bob Hainey, his brother and a Sun-Times copy chief, was found dead on a Chicago street at 35; the circumstances were addressed by Bob's son, GQ magazine editor Michael Hainey, in a 2013 book, After Visiting Friends.
 Sydney J. Harris, wrote for the Herald-Examiner from 1934-41 before launching a long career as a columnist with the Daily News
 George Wheeler Hinman, Herald-Examiner publisher, after first being owner and editor of the Chicago Inter Ocean; died in 1929
 Walter Howey, managing editor of the American, beginning in 1917; widely presumed to be the inspiration for the colorful character of editor "Walter Burns" in the play The Front Page and subsequent film adaptations, including His Girl Friday
 Harold L. Ickes, reporter for the Record at the turn of the century; U.S. Secretary of the Interior 1933-46
 James Keeley, owned the Herald from 1914-18; also served it as a World War I correspondent
 Frank King, cartoonist 1906-09; creator of Gasoline Alley
 Ring Lardner, writer for Examiner in 1900s before becoming Tribune columnist and renowned author 
 Jonathan Latimer, crime reporter, covering Al Capone and others for the Herald-Examiner, before becoming a novelist and Hollywood screenwriter; his scripts included Topper Returns, The Glass Key and The Big Clock
 Jack Mabley, columnist and associate editor for the American and Chicago Today 1961-1974; one of his most famous columns was about the measured water pressure during commercial breaks on national TV broadcasts, determining that viewers were using the toilet during the breaks
 Hazel MacDonald, born in 1890, wrote for Photoplay magazine, then reviewed films for the American until she was let go for crossing a picket line in 1938; became a war correspondent for the Chicago Daily Times
 Charles Archibald MacLellan, illustrator for the Examiner, later drew many covers for the Saturday Evening Post
 Tiny Maxwell, football player; cub reporter for the Record-Herald; college football's Maxwell Award is named for him
 Maxwell McCrohon, American reporter in 1958; became managing editor of Chicago Today in 1970; named editor of the Tribune in 1972, and later was the Los Angeles Herald-Examiner editor when that paper closed
Michael McGovern, New York Daily News investigative reporter; once went door-to-door through Evanston, Illinois asking each woman in one neighborhood if she was the illegitimate daughter of Warren G. Harding
 Buddy McHugh, thinly disguised as "McCue" in The Front Page
 Arthur Meeker, Jr., novelist and socialite, wrote travel articles for the American
 Merrill C. Meigs, publisher during the 1920s; also an aviator, for whom Meigs Field was named
 Edgar Munzel, baseball writer, later of the Sun-Times, winner of Spink Award, earning him induction into the Baseball Hall of Fame
 Brent Musburger, night sports editor of the American; became a prominent television sports personality for CBS and ABC; penned an infamous column describing Tommie Smith and John Carlos as "black-skinned storm troopers" for their protest of racial injustice in the United States during the 1968 Summer Olympics
 George Murray, was once sent to Central America and told to "find a lost city," which he promptly did; wrote a memoir about the paper called The Madhouse on Madison Street
 Wallace Rice, reporter for the Herald-American; author; designed the Flag of Chicago
 Charles Edward Russell, muckraking journalist for the American in the early 20th century; 1928 Pulitzer Prize-winning author
 E.C. Segar, cartoonist for the American, creator of Popeye
 Vaughn Shoemaker, two-time Pulitzer Prize-winning cartoonist; ended his career with Chicago's American and Chicago Today, retiring in 1972 after drawing approximately 14,000 cartoons
 Sidney Smith, cartoonist for the Examiner, 1908-11
 Wallace Smith, correspondent, covered Pancho Villa campaigns and Washington D.C. politics; became a Hollywood screenwriter, his films including 1927's Two Arabian Knights and 1934's The Captain Hates the Sea
 Wendell Smith, pioneering African American sports reporter who was requested by Branch Rickey to travel with Jackie Robinson while he was breaking into triple-A and Major League Baseball; later a sportscaster for WGN-TV
 Ashton Stevens, drama critic for Examiner and Herald American; inspired Joseph Cotten's character in Citizen Kane
 Roger Treat, vocal critic of segregation and editor of the first Pro Football Encyclopedia
 William Veeck, Sr., sports columnist who was hired away to be Chicago Cubs vice-president by William Wrigley Jr. in 1917 after a series he wrote criticizing the team; after the Cubs won the 1918 National League pennant, he was promoted to club president
 Lloyd Wendt, editor of the American from 1961–69; editor and publisher of Chicago Today 1969-70
 Brand Whitlock, reporter for the Herald; later mayor of Toledo, Ohio and ambassador to Belgium
 Frank Willard, cartoonist 1914-18, creator of Moon MullinsAlso':
John F. Kennedy, the future U.S. president, worked as a reporter at the Chicago Herald-American after serving in the Navy during World War II in 1945, where he covered the United Nations Conference held in San Francisco and the elections that ousted Winston Churchill in 1945 from London. The job was lined up by his influential father, Joseph P. Kennedy.

In the end, TV news brought an end to most afternoon papers, but up until the 1970s, Chicago had a competitive journalistic scene unmatched by most other American cities, five daily newspapers and four wire services in competition, and none were more competitive than Chicago's American.

The Americans predecessor and successor newspapersMorning Record, March 13, 1893 – March 27, 1901 (originally News Record, aka Morning News, aka Chicago Daily News (Morning Edition) beginning July 24, 1881)Chicago Times, June 1, 1861 – March 4, 1895Chicago Republican, May 30, 1865 – March 22, 1872Inter Ocean, March 25, 1872 – May 10, 1914Chicago Daily Telegraph, March 21, 1878 – May 9, 1881Morning Herald, May 10, 1893 – March 3, 1895Times-Herald, March 4, 1895 – March 26, 1901Chicago American, July 4, 1900 – August 27, 1939Chicago Record-Herald, March 28, 1901 – May 10, 1914Chicago Examiner, March 3, 1907 – May 1, 1918Chicago Record Herald & Interocean, May 11, 1914 – June 1, 1914Chicago Herald, June 14, 1914 – May 1, 1918Herald-Examiner, May 2, 1918 – August 26, 1939Herald American, August 26, 1939 – April 5, 1953The Chicago American, April 6, 1953 – September 23, 1959Chicago's New American, Sep 23, 1959 – October 24, 1959 (purchased by Chicago Tribune)Chicago's American, October 25, 1959 – April 27, 1969Chicago Today American, April 28, 1969 – May 23, 1970Chicago Today, May 24, 1970 – September 13, 1974

 See also 
 Wandt v. Hearst's Chicago American''

Footnotes

External links
 February 1922 front pages from the Chicago American

Defunct newspapers published in Chicago
Newspapers established in 1900
Publications disestablished in 1974
1900 establishments in Illinois
1974 disestablishments in Illinois